Lafitte was a French automobile manufactured in Paris from 1923–1928. The 'SA de Construction de Voiturettes Th. Lafitte', owned by Theodore Laffitte, manufactured a light cyclecar which was renowned for its innovative engineering. It incorporated a three-cylinder radial engine mounted in a hinged cage, which was tilted by the driver to engage and vary the ratio of the friction drive to the rear wheels. Uniquely, the 'variable ratio' friction drive consisted of a convex steel flywheel and a concave 'clutch plate' that was faced by wound strips of paper or sometimes leather.

History

 
Lafitte began constructing automobiles in Paris in 1923 on The Quai. In 1926 they started using the manufacturing facility in Courbevoie, of the defunct Doriot, Flandrin & Parant. In 1928 it ceased production.

Models
The Lafitte was an unconventional car. It was powered by 22 hp 3 cylinder radial engine of 736cc capacity, which was enlarged to 895cc in 1928, its final year. The engine was mounted in a hinged cage, which was tilted by the driver to engage and vary the ratio of the friction drive to the rear wheels. Uniquely, the 'variable ratio' friction drive consisted of a convex steel flywheel and a concave 'clutch plate' that was faced by wound strips of paper or sometimes leather. The new price in England was 100 pounds sterling.

In 1928, a sports version with a 25 hp, 895cc engine topped the range.

Review
It was described by Bill Boddy, editor of Motor Sport as :"The kind of thing that only an inebriated person staggering along the Strand clutching £100 in his hand, would have bought new.

Literature
 Harald H. Linz, Halwart Schrader : The International Automobile Encyclopedia . United Soft Media Verlag, Munich 2008, ISBN 978-3-8032-9876-8 .
 George Nick Georgano (Chefredakteur): The Beaulieu Encyclopedia of the Automobile. Volume 2: G–O. Fitzroy Dearborn Publishers, Chicago 2001, ISBN 1-57958-293-1. (english)
 George Nick Georgano: Autos. Encyclopédie complète. 1885 à nos jours. Courtille, Paris 1975. (french)

References

External links
 Motor Sport Magazine, May 1989, Veteran to classic - Lightweights in Wales. Page 480.
 WSCC (Westfield Sports Car Club), Newsletter, September 26, 2016. CVT from 1928 at Kop Hill, by 'Man On The Clapham Omnibus'

Cyclecars
Defunct motor vehicle manufacturers of France